Buccininum fukureum is a species of Buccinidae. The species is distributed in the southern Sea of Okhotsk, off the Gulf of Patience. Specimens have generally measured 90-92 millimeters. The species is generally found at depths of about 250–300 meters. The species was first described in 1976.

References

External links

Buccinidae
Gastropods described in 1976
Marine gastropods